Polsat News 2 is a Polish publicist-information television channel, which began broadcasting June 9, 2014 at 10 am, replacing Polsat News +. It complements the main sister channel Polsat News, with in-depth commentary. It broadcasts programs devoted to national, foreign, political, economic and cultural events.

Programming
The flagship program is To był dzień na świecie. In addition, the framework includes programs previously broadcast on Polsat Biznes, i.e. Zoom na giełdę, Biznes Informacje, Nie daj się fiskusowi oraz nowe: Prawy do Lewego, Lewy do Prawego, Rozmowa polityczna, WidziMiSię, Wysokie C, poŚwiata, Od redakcji, Pociąg do polityki, Fajka pokoju i Naczelni.

History
At the stage of preparation for launching and for the first less than two months of broadcasting, the channel was called Polsat News+. The plus sign was saved in the same way as in the Plus mobile logo, having the same owner. On July 31, 2014, the name was changed to Polsat News 2 due to a lawsuit filed by Polsat with ITI Neovision, the owner of the nc+ platform. Since ITI Neovision has the plus sign (taken from its main shareholder Canal+) all its own channels, the District Court has decided to secure the suit for the duration of the ongoing process by ordering Polsat to change its name. In November 2014, the Court of Appeal reviewed Polsat's appeal and overturned the previous decision, allowing the channel to be restored to its current name. Polsat has not yet decided on a possible renaming of the channel. In December 2014 the District Court in Warsaw issued a judgment which dismissed the suit nc+ in its entirety, but the verdict is not legally binding. However, the Court has forbidden the platform to use the "+" symbol in the name of the channel Polsat News+ and the program "+ Kultura". In addition to the prohibition, the court ordered the TV station falsity to announce that it can not use the + sign in its channels.

The logo was changed again, on August 30th, 2021, with the major rebranding of Polsat, including Polsat News 2, Polsat News’s sister channel.

References

External links
 

Polsat
Television channels in Poland
Television channels and stations established in 2014
2014 establishments in Poland
Polish-language television stations
Mass media in Warsaw